Nicholas Jonas is the debut studio album by American singer Nick Jonas.

Track listing

References 

2005 debut albums
Nick Jonas albums
Albums produced by Carl Sturken and Evan Rogers
Contemporary Christian music albums by American artists